Nelson is a populated place situated in Yavapai County, Arizona, United States. It is one of two locations in the state with this name, the other being the census-designated place, Nelson in Pima County.

References

Populated places in Yavapai County, Arizona